Sally St. Clair or St. Clare (died 1782) was an American woman from South Carolina who disguised herself as a man and joined the Continental Army. Her true gender was not discovered by her fellow soldiers until after she was killed in battle during the Siege of Savannah in 1782.

Little is known about St. Clair. She is variously described as a Creole woman, a woman of color, and a woman of African and French descent. By some accounts she joined the army to be with her lover, sergeant William Jaspar from Francis Marion's Brigade, and was killed saving his life. She may have served as a gunner. Several sources claim she was killed during the Battle of Savannah in 1778.

"Romantic Victorians" such as George Pope Morris claimed that even her lover did not recognize her until after she was killed and her body was prepared for burial. Morris's poem about St. Clair begins:

In the ranks of Marion's band,
Through morass and wooded land,
Over beach of yellow sand,
     Mountain, plain and valley;
A southern maid, in all her pride,
March'd gayly at her lover's side,
          In such disguise 
          That e'en his eyes
     Did not discover Sally.

Morris describes St. Clair as a "beautiful, dark-eyed Creole girl" with "long, jetty ringlets," and claims that she died of a lance thrust aimed at her lover, Sergeant Jasper. He goes on to say that "there was not a dry eye in the corps when Sally St. Clair was laid in her grave, near the River Santee, in a green shady nook that looked as if it had been stolen out of Paradise."

Warren Wildwood tells her story in similarly picturesque terms in Thrilling Adventures Among the Early Settlers (1866).

A commentary in  a 1906 South Carolina historical society article detailing a 1784 land grant given to Sgt. Jasper's heir William Jasper, says the reading of the land grant information "is recommended to the consideration of those people who believe that silly story about a girl named Sinclair who in man's attire followed Jasper into service because of her love for him and was killed in an action on the Santee."

See also 
Margaret Corbin
Anna Maria Lane
Mary Ludwig Hays
Deborah Sampson

References 

1782 deaths
Year of death uncertain
Women in 18th-century warfare
Female wartime cross-dressers
Female United States Army personnel
Women in the American Revolution
Continental Army soldiers
People of South Carolina in the American Revolution
African-American female military personnel
African-American United States Army personnel